William B. Fitzgerald Sr. (February 3, 1914December 7, 1970) was a Michigan politician.

Early life
Fitzgerald was born on February 3, 1914, in Troy, New York.

Career
On November 7, 1978, Fitzgerald was elected to the Michigan House of Representatives where he represented the 4th district from January 13, 1965, until his death in office on December 7, 1970.

Personal life
Fitzgerald had two children, including fellow state representative William B. Fitzgerald Jr. William B. Fitzgerald's brother, George S. Fitzgerald, was also a state legislator. Fitzgerald was Catholic.

References

Democratic Party members of the Michigan House of Representatives
Catholics from Michigan
1914 births
1970 deaths
Politicians from Troy, New York
20th-century American politicians